Csaba Hende (born 5 February 1960) is a Hungarian politician who served as Minister of Defence of Hungary from 29 May 2010 to 9 September 2015 when he resigned.

Hende was born in Szombathely in 1960. In 1983 he graduated in law at the Eötvös Loránd University in Budapest, then practiced as a lawyer in his hometown of Szombathely. Beginning in 1988, he was a member of Hungarian Democratic Forum (MDF). In 1991 he joined the government as parliamentary secretary of state of the Defence Ministry. During the rule of socialist-liberal cabinet (1994–1998) he returned to practice law in Szombathely. In the first government of Viktor Orbán he served as Secretary of State in the Ministry of Justice. At the beginning of the 21st century, he held high functions in the MDF party (including Vice-President), but in 2004 he joined Fidesz. In 2006 and 2010 he was re-elected to the National Assembly on behalf of Fidesz in Vas County. Hende was appointed Minister of Defence in 2010.

His first measure as minister was the replacement of the Chief of General Staff of the Armed Forces general (OF-9) László Tömböl and more high-rank military officers. The Hungarian Socialist Party criticized the decision as incomprehensible. Hende justified his step with the fact that many tax evasions and maladministration happened in the army under the previous government. He said that he would restore the honour and prestige of the Hungarian Defence Forces.

On 7 September 2015, Hende resigned his post after the armed forces, which he oversaw as minister, were building the Hungarian border barrier (to keep migrants and refugees out of Hungary) too slowly. He was replaced by István Simicskó on 10 September.

On 2 October 2017, Hende was appointed Chairman of the Legislative Committee in the Hungarian Parliament, and thus also became Deputy Speaker for Legislation.

Personal life
He is married. His first wife was Szilvia Stiber. They had two daughters together, Júlia and Borbála. His second wife is Mónika Szajlai.

References

External links
Biography

1960 births
Living people
Defence ministers of Hungary
Hungarian Democratic Forum politicians
Fidesz politicians
Members of the National Assembly of Hungary (2002–2006)
Members of the National Assembly of Hungary (2006–2010)
Members of the National Assembly of Hungary (2010–2014)
Members of the National Assembly of Hungary (2014–2018)
Members of the National Assembly of Hungary (2018–2022)
Members of the National Assembly of Hungary (2022–2026)
People from Szombathely